Ribbing is a Swedish noble family of medieval origin. which may refer to:

Adolph Ribbing (1765–1843), Swedish count and politician who took part in the regicide of Gustav III in 1792
Beata Rosenhane (1638–1674, spouse of Baron Erik Ribbing), Swedish writer
Elizabeth Ribbing (1596–1662), Swedish noble and lady-in-waiting, secret morganatic spouse of Prince Charles, second son of King Charles IX
Magdalena Ribbing (1940–2017), Swedish writer, journalist, etiquette expert and lecturer

See also

Ribbing (knitting)
Rib (disambiguation)